Romerike Police District is one of 27 police districts in Norway, covering the Romerike district of Akershus. The district is headquartered in Lillestrøm and consists of two police stations, at Lillestrøm and Gardermoen (at Oslo Airport, Gardermoen), and nine sheriff's offices. The district is led by Chief of Police Jørgen L. Høidahl. Specifically the police district covers the municipalities of Aurskog-Høland, Sørum, Fet, Rælingen, Lørenskog, Skedsmo, Nittedal, Gjerdrum, Ullensaker, Nes, Eidsvoll, Nannestad, Hurdal. As of 2011, the district had 651 employees. It has a special responsibility for the border control at Oslo Airport, Gardermoen.

References

Police districts in Norway
Organisations based in Skedsmo